Sri Lanka is a tropical island situated close to the southern tip of India. It is situated in the middle of Indian Ocean. 

Lichens are a mutual relationship between algae or cyanobacteria with a fungus. Therefore it is a composite organism and not plants. Lichens can be found different shapes and forms. They are grouped by thallus type. Thallus growth forms typically correspond to a few basic internal structure types. Common names for lichens often come from a growth form or color that is typical of a lichen genus. Coloration is usually determined by the photosynthetic component.

Sri Lanka is an island, which serves a great diversity vegetation that includes many endemic flora and fauna. George Henry Kendrick Thwaites was the first person to collect lichens in Sri Lanka, in 1868. In 1870,  W.A. Leighton examined Thwaites' collection and determined 199 species. In 1900, Almquist's collections in 1879 formed the basis of "Nylander's Lichenes Ceylonenses". In 1932, Arthur Hugh Garfit Alston listed 89 lichen species common to the Kandy district. In 1970, F. Hale collected lichens in lowland rain forests and compiled a regional monograph of Relicina and Thelotremataceae in Sri Lanka. In 1984, Brunnbauer compiled a bibliographic description of lichens in Sri Lanka in 15 fascicles included 550 species belonging to 122 genera and 48 families. During the coming years, many foreign scientists such as Moberg (1986, 1987), Awasthi (1991), Makhija and Patwardhan (1992), Breuss et al. (1997) and Vezda et al. (1997) increased the recorded number of lichens in Sri Lanka up to 659 species.

Sri Lankan lichen biota has been studied by lichenologist Gothamie Weerakoon along with many other local and foreign researchers. The systematic classification of lichen was started in 2012 by Weerakoon and discovered more than 1200 lichen species from the island. Almost half of the described lichens are represented by the family Graphidaceae. In 2003 during a lichen survey in the Kandy municipal region, about 80 lichen species belonging to 18 families and 32 genera were recorded by Nayanakantha and Gajameragedara. Of them 33 (66%) were crustose lichens, 11 (22%) foliose, 4 (8%) placodioid and the remaining 4% were fruticose and squamulose lichens.

In 2013, Weerakoon discovered 51 new varieties of Lichens endemic to Sri Lanka, where 8 of them were found from the Knuckles Mountain Range. In 2014, Weerakoon documented over 200 new lichen records from Sri Lanka, with three new species. While Udeni Jayalal et al. found 2 new lichens from Horton Plains in 2012, as Anzia mahaeliyensis and Anzia flavotenuis. In 2015, Weerakoon et al. found 6 new Graphidaceae lichens from Horton Plains. In 2016, Weerakoon and André Aptroot described 64 new records of lichens of Sri Lanka. In May 2016, Weerakoon et al. recorded8 new lichen species and 88 new records from Sri Lanka.

Lichens of Sri Lanka

 Amandinea efflorescens
 Anisomeridium albisedum
 Anisomeridium anisolobum
 Anisomeridium polycarpum
 Anisomeridium subprostans
 Anisomeridium tarmugliense
 Anthracothecium duplicans
 Anzia mahaeliyensis
 Anzia flavotenuis
 Arthonia antillarum
 Arthonia calcicola
 Arthonia elegans
 Arthonia karunaratnei
 Arthonia redingeri
 Arthonia tumiduh
 Arthopyrenia cinchonae
 Arthopyrenia majuscula
 Arthopyrenia planorbis
 Arthothelium confertum
 Astrothelium cinnamomeum
 Astrothelium conjugatum
 Astrothelium galbineum
 Astrothelium nitidulum
 Bacidia medialis
 Bacidia millegrana
 Bacidiopsora psorina
 Bathelium feei
 Buellia disciformis
 Buellia morehensis
 Buellia tincta
 Bulbothrix bulbochaeta
 Bulbothrix goebelii
 Bulbothrix hypocraea
 Bulbothrix setschwanensis
 Bunodophoron macrocarpum
 Canoparmelia carneopruinata
 Chrysothrix candelaris
 Caloplaca crenularia
 Canoparmelia owariensis
 Catillaria leptocheiloides
 Cetrelia olivetorum
 Chapsa thambapanni 
 Cladonia cartilaginea
 Cladonia corniculata
 Cladonia fruticulosa
 Cladonia homchantarae
 Cladonia humilis
 Cladonia kurokawae
 Cladonia mauritiana
 Cladonia mongkolsukii
 Cladonia phyllopoda
 Cladonia singhii
 Cladonia subdelicatula
 Cladonia submultiformis
 Cladonia subradiata
 Cladonia subsquamosa
 Coccocarpia palmicola
 Coccocarpia stellata
 Coenogonium isidiatum
 Coenogonium linkii
 Coenogonium nepalense
 Coenogonium roumeguerianum
 Collema actinoptychum
 Cratiria obscurior 
 Cratiria rutilans
 Cresponea plurilocularis
 Cresponea proximata
 Crocynia gossypina
 Crocynia pyxinoides
 Cryptolechia caudata
 Cryptolechia plurilocularis
 Cryptothecia punctosorediata
 Dichosporidium boschianum
 Dictyonema thelephora
 Dirinaria consimilis
 Dirinaria purpurascens
 Endocarpon pallidulum
 Eschatogonia marivelensis
 Enterographa mesomela
 Enterographa tropica
 Enterographa wijesundarae
 Fellhanera stipitata
 Fissurina lumbschiana
 Fissurina tuberculifera 
 Flavopunctelia flaventior
 Fuscopannaria coerulescens
 Fuscopannaria dissecta
 Graphina balbisif
 Graphina fissqfiircata
 Graphina poilaef 
 Graphis anguilliformis
 Graphis mahaeliyensis
 Gyrostomum scypidiferun
 Haematomma accolens
 Haematomma flexuosum
 Hafellia curatellae
 Hafellia parastata
 Herpothallon albidum
 Herpothallon fertile
 Herpothallon granulare
 Herpothallon philippinum
 Herpothallon roseocinctum
 Heterodermia antillarum
 Heterodermia circinalis
 Heterodermia dactyliza
 Heterodermia firmula
 Heterodermia fragmentata
 Heterodermia galactophylla
 Heterodermia incana
 Heterodermia microphylla
 Heterodermia pseudospeciosa
 Heterodermia queensberryi 
 Heterodermia reagens
 Heterodermia speciosa
 Heterodermia violostrata
 Hyperphyscia adglutinata
 Hypogymnia fragillima
 Hypogymnia pseudobitteriana
 Hypotrachyna awasthii
 Hypotrachyna brevirhiza
 Hypotrachyna infirma
 Hypotrachyna physcioides
 Hypotrachyna rigidula
 Hypotrachyna rockii
 Laurera meristospora
 Lecanactis minutissima
 Lecanora afrab
 Lecanora flavoviridis
 Lecanora helva
 Lecanora leprosa
 Lecanora novaehollandiae
 Lecanora subfusca
 Lecanora subimmersa
 Lecanora tropica
 Lepraria atrotomentosa
 Lepraria nigrocincta
 Lepraria sipmaniana
 Leproloma sipmanianum
 Leptogium austroamericanum
 Leptogium azureum
 Leptogium cochleatum
 Leptogium corticola
 Leptogium denticulatum
 Leptogium hibernicum
 Leptogium marginellum
 Leptogium milligranum
 Leptogium streimannii
 Leptogium trichophorum
 Letrouitia parabola
 Letrouitia sayeri
 Letrouitia transgressa
 Lithothelium obtectum
 Lobothallia alphoplaca
 Malmidea aurigera
 Malmidea badimioides
 Malmidea bakeri
 Malmidea duplomarginata
 Malmidea gyalectoides
 Malmidea hypomela
 Malmidea leptoloma
 Malmidea papillosa
 Malmidea plicata
 Malmidea sorsogona
 Malmidea subgranifera
 Malmidea vinosa
 Mazosia carnea
 Mazosia phyllosema
 Megalotremis biocellata
 Megalotremis cylindrica
 Megalotremis lateralis
 Megalotremis pustulata
 Mycomicrothelia conothelena
 Mycoporum eschweileri
 Mycoporum sparsellum
 Myeloconis fecunda
 Myriotrema compunctum
 Myriotrema glaucophaenum
 Ochrolechia africana
 Opegrapha subvulgata
 Opegrapha varia
 Opegrapha viridis
 Parmeliella brisbanensis
 Parmeliella isidiophora
 Parmeliella mariana
 Parmeliella stylophora
 Parmelinella simplicior 
 Parmelinopsis minarum
 Parmelinopsis spumosa
 Parmotrema abessinicum
 Parmotrema andinum
 Parmotrema cetratum
 Parmotrema clavuliferum
 Parmotrema cooperi
 Parmotrema crinita
 Parmotrema durumae
 Parmotrema grayanum
 Parmotrema latissimum
 Parmotrema lobulascens
 Parmotrema mellissii
 Parmotrema nilgherrense
 Parmotrema poolii
 Parmotrema praesorediosum
 Parmotrema subtinctorium
 Parmotrema tinctorum
 Parmotrema uberrimum
 Parmotrema zollingeri
 Peltula euploca
 Peltula placodizans
 Peltula rodriguesii
 Pertusaria commutata
 Pertusaria lacerans
 Pertusaria nigrata
 Pertusaria pertusa
 Pertusaria porinella
 Pertusaria substerescens
 Pertusaria tropica
 Pertusaria truncata
 Phaeocalicium curtisii
 Phaeographina caesioradians
 Phaeographina coniexia
 Phlyctis brasiliensis
 Phlyctis himalayensis
 Phlyctis lueckingii 
 Phlyctis monosperma
 Phyllopsora borbonica
 Phyllopsora breviuscula
 Phyllopsora confusa
 Phyllopsora corallina
 Phyllopsora dolichospora
 Phyllopsora foliata
 Phyllopsora furfuracea
 Phyllopsora kiiensis
 Physcia alba
 Physcia atrostriata
 Physcia dimidiata
 Physcia erumpens
 Physcia integrata
 Physcia poncinsii
 Physcia sorediosa
 Physcia verrucosa
 Physma byrsaeum
 Polychidium dendriscum
 Polymeridium inspersum
 Polymeridium quinqueseptatum
 Porina africana
 Porina americana
 Porina bellendenica
 Porina conspersa
 Porina corrugata
 Porina curtula
 Porina dolichophora
 Porina eminentior
 Porina innata
 Porina internigrans
 Porina mastoidella
 Porina microtriseptata
 Porina monilisidiata
 Porina nucula
 Porina nuculastrum
 Porina viridipustulata
 Pseudopyrenula subgregaria
 Pseudopyrenula subnudata
 Psoroglaena spinosa
 Pyrenula acutispora
 Pyrenula aggregataspistea
 Pyrenula anomala
 Pyrenula bahiana
 Pyrenula breutelii
 Pyrenula circumfiniens
 Pyrenula dermatodes
 Pyrenula fetivica
 Pyrenula globifera
 Pyrenula inframamillana
 Pyrenula leucotrypa
 Pyrenula massariospora
 Pyrenula micheneri
 Pyrenula microcarpa
 Pyrenula multicolorata
 Pyrenula nitidula
 Pyrenula parvinuclea
 Pyrenula quassiaecola
 Pyrenula submastophora
 Pyxine coccifera
 Pyxine consocians
 Pyxine copelandii
 Pyxine cylindrica
 Pyxine fallax
 Pyxine farinosa
 Pyxine keralensis
 Pyxine maculata
 Pyxine meissnerina
 Pyxine retirugella
 Pyxine simulans
 Pyxine subcinerea
 Ramalina conduplicans
 Ramalina farinacea
 Ramalina hossei
 Ramalina inflata
 Ramboldia haematites
 Ramboldia russula
 Relicinopsis intertexta
 Remototrachyna costaricensis
 Rimelia reticulata
 Schismatomma gemmatum
 Schistophoron muriforme
 Septotrapelia glauca
 Siphula decumbens
 Sporopodium flavescens
 Stereocaulon foliolosum
 Sticta limbata
 Sticta platyphylloides
 Stirtonia isidiata
 Tephromela atra
 Thelotrema heladiwense
 Thysanothecium scutellatum
 Topeliopsis muscigena
 Topeliopsis subtuberculifera 
 Trypetheliopsis gigas
 Trypetheliopsis hirsuta
 Trypethelium eluteriae
 Trypethelium epileucodes
 Trypethelium nitidiusculum
 Trypethelium subeluteriae
 Trypethelium tropicum
 Tylophoron moderatum
 Usnea bismolliuscula
 Usnea complanata
 Usnea cornuta
 Usnea pangiana
 Usnea steineri
 Vainionora flavovirens

References

External links
 Molecular phylogeny and bioprospecting of Endolichenic Fungi (ELF) inhabiting in the lichens collected from a mangrove ecosystem in Sri Lanka
 A determination of air pollution in Colombo and Kurunegala, Sri Lanka, using energy dispersive X-ray fluorescence spectrometry on Heterodermia speciosa
 Nature and bioactivities of endolichenic fungi in Pseudocyphellaria sp., Parmotrema sp. and Usnea sp. at Hakgala montane forest in Sri Lanka
 Fascinating Lichens of Sri Lanka
 Insights into the unique butterfly-lichen association between Talicada nyseus nyseus and Leproloma sipmanianum
 Chemistry of Heterodermia microphylla, a lichen new to Sri Lanka 
 New species of the lichen family Thelotremataceae in SE Asia
 A Key to the Microlichens of India, Nepal and Sri Lanka

 
Lists of lichens
lichens